Elwalid Succariyeh is a Sunni Lebanese member of parliament representing the Baalbeck-Hermel district. He is part of Hezbollah's bloc. He was elected a member of the Lebanese Parliament in 2009, replacing his brother Ismael Succariyeh.

See also
 Lebanese Parliament
 Members of the 2009-2013 Lebanese Parliament
 Hezbollah

References

Living people
Members of the Parliament of Lebanon
Lebanese Sunni Muslims
Hezbollah politicians
Year of birth missing (living people)